Lovozero is a rural locality (a selo) and the administrative center of Lovozersky District in Murmansk Oblast, Russia, located on both banks of the Virma River, which is not far from Lake Lovozero, and  southeast of Murmansk, the administrative center of the oblast. Population:  It is the second largest locality in the district after Revda.

History
In 1574, the settlement of Loyyavrsiyt (literally, "settlement of strong people by the lake") was founded at the site of modern Lovozero. Lovozero itself is first mentioned in chronicles in 1608.

Economy
The main business in Lovozero is the agricultural and reindeer husbandry cooperative Tundra. Fishing, hunting, and picking cloudberries are also important.

Transportation

Military

Culture

Several Sami festivals are held in Lovozero, which is why it is often called "the Sami capital of Russia." There is also a museum showcasing traditional Sami culture and way of life.

Climate
Lovozero has a subarctic climate due to its high latitude. In spite of this, the climate is a lot less severe than other Russian climates further east. Even so, it is colder than areas to the west that are a lot milder due to a greater Gulf Stream influence, with mean temperatures of below  in the two coldest months. Winters are drier than summers, but still snowy enough to build a reliable snow pack for several months. Due to the relatively mild July months, Lovozero is below the Arctic tree line.

External links

References

Notes

Sources

Rural localities in Murmansk Oblast
Sámi in Russia
Sámi-language municipalities
Populated places established in 1574
Kolsky Uyezd